Red Creek is an unincorporated community in Tucker County, West Virginia, United States. Red Creek has a post office with ZIP code 26289. Originally called Flanangan Hill after early settler Ebenezer Flanagan, the community was named Red Creek by the community's first postmaster William Raines. Being a Democrat, Raines refused to name the post office after the Republican Flanagan family, and thus named it for a nearby creek. The Red Creek post office was established in 1856.

Climate
The climate in this area has mild differences between highs and lows, and there is adequate rainfall year-round.  According to the Köppen Climate Classification system, Red Creek has a marine west coast climate, abbreviated "Cfb" on climate maps.

References

Unincorporated communities in Tucker County, West Virginia
Unincorporated communities in West Virginia